Haarlem Kennemerland is a Dutch football club from the city of Haarlem, established in 2010 as the result of a fusion between the old HFC Haarlem and amateur Tweede Klasse club HFC Kennemerland, after the former club was excluded in January 2010 due to bankruptcy.

History

On January 25, 2010, HFC Haarlem was declared bankrupt and was thus according to Dutch league rules excluded from the 2009–10 Eerste Divisie.

In February 2010, HFC Haarlem was reborn as an amateur club that took the naming and logo rights of the old team. The club began talks for a potential merger with the amateur Haarlem-based side HFC Kennemerland from the Tweede Klasse, It was announced that the merger was completed on April 27; the new club was named Haarlem Kennemerland, and would play home games at Haarlem Stadion, thus aiming to continue the legacy of the old HFC Haarlem.

References

External links
Official website (in Dutch)

Football clubs in the Netherlands
Football clubs in Haarlem
Association football clubs established in 2010
2010 establishments in the Netherlands